Lucky Labrador Brewing Company, often referred to as Lucky Lab, is a brewery based in Portland, Oregon, United States. The business was established in 1994. Gary Geist is a co-owner.
The brewery became the first in Oregon to use solar power for brewing.

Locations
There have been multiple locations in Portland. The original pub is on Hawthorne Boulevard in southeast Portland's Buckman neighborhood.
Another is in southwest Portland's Multnomah Village. A third is located in northwest Portland's Northwest District neighborhood. In December 2022, the business announced plans to close the location at 1700 North Killingsworth Street in the Overlook neighborhood.

See also 

 Brewing in Oregon

References

External links

 

1994 establishments in Oregon
American companies established in 1994
Beer brewing companies based in Oregon
Buckman, Portland, Oregon
Northwest District, Portland, Oregon
Restaurants established in 1994
Restaurants in Portland, Oregon
Southwest Portland, Oregon
Overlook, Portland, Oregon